Maneka Sanjay Gandhi (also spelled Menaka; née Anand) (born 26 August 1956) is an Indian politician, animal rights activist, and environmentalist. She is a member of the Lok Sabha, the lower house of the Indian parliament and a member of the Bharatiya Janata Party (BJP). She is the widow of Indian politician Sanjay Gandhi. She has been a minister in four governments, most recently in Narendra Modi's government from May 2014 to May 2019. Gandhi inspired many individuals towards social entrepreneurship for example TreeAndHumanKnot in August 2020 which triggered it become a nationwide movement to plant fruit trees by couples. 

She also authored a number of books in the areas of etymology, law and animal welfare.

Personal life
Maneka Anand was born on 26 August 1956 in Delhi, India into a Sikh family. Her father was Indian Army officer Lt. Col. Tarlochan Singh Anand and her mother was Amteshwar Anand, daughter of Sir Datar Singh. She was educated at The Lawrence School, Sanawar and later at Lady Shri Ram College for Women. She subsequently studied German at Jawaharlal Nehru University, New Delhi.

Maneka first met Sanjay Gandhi in 1973 at a cocktail party thrown by her uncle, Major-General Kapur, to celebrate the forthcoming marriage of his son. Maneka married Gandhi, the son of the Prime Minister Indira Gandhi, one year later on 23 September 1974.

The Emergency of 1975–77 saw the rise of Sanjay into politics and Maneka was seen with him almost every time on his tours as she helped him in campaigns. It is often said that during the Emergency, Sanjay had total control over his mother (Indira) and that the government was run by the PMH (Prime Minister House) rather than the PMO (Prime Minister Office).

Maneka Gandhi founded the news magazine Surya which later played a key role in promotion of the Congress party after its defeat in the 1977 election following the Emergency.

Gandhi went to court to fight an attempt by the government in power at the time to confiscate her passport and won a landmark decision on personal liberty. In the case of Maneka Gandhi v Union of India, the court found that "Democracy is based essentially on free debate and open discussion, for that is the only corrective of government action in a democratic setup."

In 1980, Gandhi gave birth to a son, Feroze, named after his paternal grandfather. Her mother-in-law added the name Varun. Gandhi was just twenty-three years old, and her son just 100 days old, when her husband died in an air crash.

Early life and career
Maneka's relationship with Indira Gandhi gradually disintegrated after Sanjay's death and they would continually argue with one another. Maneka was eventually forced out of 1, Safdarjung Road, the prime minister's  residence, after a fallout with Indira. She founded the Rashtriya Sanjay Manch along with Akbar Ahmad. The party primarily focused on youth empowerment and employment. It won four out of five seats in the Elections in Andhra Pradesh.

Gandhi published The Complete Book of Muslim and Parsi Names, in recognition of her husband's Zoroastrian faith.

She later published The Penguin Book of Hindu Names for Boys.

Gandhi contested the Amethi constituency from Uttar Pradesh for the 1984 general election for the Lok Sabha, but lost to Rajiv Gandhi. In 1988, she joined V. P. Singh's Janata Dal Party and became the General Secretary. In the 1989 Indian general election, Gandhi won her first election to Parliament and became a Minister of State as the Minister for Environment.

Activism
Gandhi is an environmentalist and animal rights leader in India. She has earned international awards and acclaim. She was appointed chairwoman of the Committee for the Purpose of Control and Supervision of Experiments on Animals (CPCSEA) in 1995. Under her direction, CPCSEA members carried unannounced inspections of laboratories where animals are used for scientific research were conducted.

Gandhi has filed Public Interest Litigations that have achieved the replacement of the municipal killing of homeless dogs with a sterilisation programme (Animal Birth Control programs, commonly abbreviated as ABCs), the unregulated sale of airguns and a ban on mobile or travelling zoos. She currently chairs  the Jury of International Energy Globe Foundation  which meets annually in Austria to award the best environmental innovations of the year.  She is a member of the Eurosolar Board and the Wuppertal Institute, Germany.

Gandhi started the organisation People for Animals in 1992 and it is the largest organisation for animal rights/welfare in India. Gandhi is also a patron of International Animal Rescue. While she is not a vegan, she has advocated this lifestyle on ethical and health grounds. She also anchored the weekly television program Heads and Tails, highlighting the suffering meted out to animals due to their commercial exploitation. She has also authored a book under the same title. Her other books were about Indian people names. She is a cast member for the documentary A Delicate Balance.

Criticism
Gandhi has often been criticized for her comments.
Threatening a veterinarian over phone
In June 2021, she called a veterinarian, threatening to cancel his license for am allegedly botched up amputation surgery of a dog. Despite a veterinarian was trying to make her aware of the situation that he has exercised all due care during surgery and it was a ferocious dog which had torn-up bandages and surgical wounds after surgery, she hurled abusive and unparliamentary words. The call was recorded and was made viral on social media. All veterinary associations have condemned and protested her behavior.

Male Suicide Views
In June 2017, during a Facebook Live session, she commented that men do not commit suicide. She received negative responses to the comment and spent the rest of the chat answering questions related to this, with chatters pointing out that 68% of the suicide cases reported in India were committed by men.

False Harassment Threat
In January 2021, Deepika Narayan Bharadwaj came forward with an audio tape where Maneka Gandhi was allegedly berating a man for hitting a dog, and was threatening to file sexual harassment cases against him. The man on the tape claimed that it was in self defense, as the dog had bitten his daughter.

Curfew for Women
In March 2017, she said that an early curfew for girls in hostels helped young women control their "hormonal outbursts" and received a backlash for the comment.

Views on Marital Rape
In 2016, she stated that she was against the criminalization of marital rape and received a heavy backlash for the comment.

Alleged spread of hatred against Muslims
Police in Kerala booked Gandhi the basis of complaints against her for promoting hatred by levelling accusations coated with communal overtones for a death of a pregnant elephant, against residents in the Muslim-majority district of Malappuram in June 2020. While the elephant died in Mannarcad, Palakkad district, nearly 90 km from Malappuram, BJP leaders including Gandhi targeted the only Muslim-majority district of Kerala. She said: “It’s a murder. Malappuram is famous for such incidents, it’s India’s most violent district. For instance, they throw poison on roads so that 300–400 birds & dogs die at one time”. The incident was used by many right-wingers to proliferate anti-Muslim resentment and to demonize the community. A multitude of hateful messages towards Malappuram and its people accompanied her remarks, triggering enraged responses. She was charged with adding communal color to an animal-related issue that would otherwise be constrained within the Department of Forests. A group calling themselves Kerala Cyber Warriors briefly hacked Maneka Gandhi's website, People for Animals, India.

Electoral history
 1984 – Lost to Rajiv Gandhi from  Amethi (Lok Sabha constituency) over 2.7L votes, was contesting as an Independent Candidate
 1989–91 – Member of Lok Sabha from  Pilibhit (Lok Sabha constituency), elected on a Janata Dal party ticket
  1991   – Lost as Janata Dal candidate to BJP's Parashuram in Pilibhit 
 1996–98 – Member of Lok Sabha from  Pilibhit (Lok Sabha constituency), elected on a Janata Dal party ticket
 1998–99 – Member of Lok Sabha from  Pilibhit (Lok Sabha constituency), elected as an Independent Candidate
 1999–2004 – Member of Lok Sabha from  Pilibhit (Lok Sabha constituency), elected as an Independent Candidate
 2004–09 – Member of Lok Sabha from  Pilibhit (Lok Sabha constituency), elected on a Bharatiya Janata Party ticket
 2009–14   – Member of Lok Sabha from  Aonla (Lok Sabha constituency), elected on a Bharatiya Janata Party ticket
 2014–19 – Member of Lok Sabha from  Pilibhit (Lok Sabha constituency), elected on a Bharatiya Janata Party ticket
 2019–present – Member of Lok Sabha from Sultanpur (Lok Sabha constituency), elected on a Bharatiya Janata Party ticket.

Positions held
 1988–89 – General-Secretary, Janata Dal (J.D.)
 1989–91 – Union Minister of State (Independent Charge), Environment and Forests
 January–April 1990 – Union Minister of State (Independent Charge), Programme Implementation
 1996–97 – Member, Committee on Science and Technology, Environment and Forests
 1998–99 – Union Minister of State (Independent Charge) Social Justice and Empowerment.
 13 October 1999 – 1 September 2001–  Union Minister of State, Social Justice and Empowerment (Independent Charge)
 1 September 2001 – 18 November 2001 – Union Minister of State, Culture with an additional charge of Animal Care (Independent Charge) Programme Implementation and Statistics with added charge of Animal Care (Independent Charge)
 18 November 2001 – 30 June 2002 – Union Minister of State, Programme Implementation and Statistics with an additional charge of Animal Care (Independent Charge)
 2002–2004 – Member, Committee on External Affairs
 2004 – Member, Committee on Health & Family Welfare, Member, Consultative Committee, Ministry of Environment and Forests
 5 August 2007 – onwards Member, Committee on Health & Family Welfare
 31 August 2009 – Became Member of Committee on Railways
 23 September 2009 – Chairperson, Committee on Government Assurances
 19 October 2009 – Member, General Purposes Committee
  26 May 2014 – Union Minister of Women & Child Development

In popular culture 
Gandhi hosted Maneka's Ark, an environmental talk show which aired on the Indian national public broadcaster Doorarshan's DD National channel in the 1990s. She had earlier hosted Heads & Tails, an animal rights show, on the same channel.

Awards
Shining World Compassion Award along with a cheque for 20,000 dollars from Supreme Master Ching Hai International Association.
Lord Erskine Award from the RSPCA, 1992
Environmentalist and Vegetarian of the year 1994
Prani Mitra Award, 1996
Maharana Mewar Foundation Award, 1996 for Environmental work
Marchig Animal Welfare and selling Prize, Switzerland, 1997
Venu Menon Animal Allies Foundation Lifetime Achievement Award, 1999
Bhagwan Mahaveer Foundation Award for Excellence in the sphere of Truth, Non-violence and Vegetarianism, 1999
Dewaliben Charitable Trust Award, 1999
International Women's Association Woman of the Year Award, Chennai, 2001
Dinanath Mangeshkar Aadishakti Puraskar in the field of Environment and animal welfare, 2001
Rukmini Devi Arundale Animal Welfare Award
A.S.G. Jayakar award, 2008
 Human Achiever Award in field of Women Empowerment and Children Welfare by Mrs Caroline W/O Ambassador Of Namibia and Ms Sanorita Issac, founder & Chairperson,  Human Achiever Foundation, India.

Books
1000 animal quiz, Calcutta : Rupa and Co., 1989, 201 p.
Brahma's hair : the mythology of Indian plants,  Calcutta : Rupa and Co., 1991, 175 p. With Yasmin Singh.
The Penguin book of Hindu names, London : Penguin Books; New Delhi : Penguin Books India, 1992, 522 p. Latest edition in 2008.
Dogs, dogs, dogs, New Delhi : Rupa & Co., 1994, 261 p. With Ozair Husain. Latest edition in 2004.
The complete book of Muslim and Parsi names, New Delhi : Indus, 1994, 522 p. With Ozair Husain.
Heads and tails, Mapusa, Goa, India : Other India Press, 1994, 182 p. On animal rights and animal rights.
The rainbow and other stories, New Delhi : Puffin Books, 1999, 67 p. Children's short stories.
The Penguin book of Hindu names for boys, New Delhi : Penguin Books, 2004, 429 p.
The Penguin book of Hindu names for girls, New York : Penguin Books, 2004, 151 p.
The Rupa book of animal quiz, Rupa & Co., 2004, 201 p.
Animal laws of India, New Delhi, India : Universal Law Publishing, 2016, 1649 p. With Ozair Husain and Raj Panjwani.
Sanjay Gandhi, New Delhi : Prestige Publishers, 2017, 244 p. With Himani Bhatia Narula.
There's a monster under my bed! : and other terrible terrors, Gurgaon : Puffin Books, 2019, 54 p. Children's short stories. Illustrations by Snigdha Rao.

See also
Political Families of The World
 List of animal rights advocates

References

|-

|-

|-

|-

|-

External links

 Profile at Lok Sabha, Parliament of India

1956 births
Living people
Janata Dal politicians
Bharatiya Janata Party politicians from Uttar Pradesh
Indian animal rights activists
Indian environmentalists
Indian Sikhs
Indian women environmentalists
Punjabi people
20th-century Indian women writers
20th-century Indian writers
Nehru–Gandhi family
People from Pilibhit
India MPs 1989–1991
India MPs 1996–1997
India MPs 1998–1999
India MPs 1999–2004
India MPs 2004–2009
India MPs 2009–2014
India MPs 2014–2019
India MPs 2019–present
V. P. Singh administration
Animal welfare and rights in India
Lawrence School, Sanawar alumni
Lok Sabha members from Uttar Pradesh
Women in Uttar Pradesh politics
Narendra Modi ministry
Women writers from Delhi
20th-century Indian women politicians
20th-century Indian politicians
21st-century Indian women politicians
21st-century Indian politicians
Women members of the Lok Sabha
People from Bareilly district
National Democratic Alliance candidates in the 2019 Indian general election
Culture Ministers of India
Indian vegetarianism activists